Vladislaus III (c.1228–1247) was Margrave of Moravia and heir to the Bohemian Kingdom of the Přemyslid dynasty.

Vladislaus was born as the eldest son to Wenceslaus I, King of Bohemia, and his wife Kunigunde of Hohenstaufen, daughter of Philip of Swabia, King of Germany. His younger brother was the latter King Ottokar.

As heir to the throne, his father appointed him Margrave of Moravia.

His father, King Wenceslaus, aimed at acquiring the neighbouring Duchy of Austria, which had been without a ruler since the death of Duke Frederick II in 1246. To reach that aim, Wenceslaus arranged a marriage of Vladislaus with the last Duke's niece Gertrud. Vladislaus received the homage of the Austrian nobility, but died shortly afterwards, on 3 January 1247, before he could take possession of the duchy.

Ancestry

1227 births
1247 deaths
13th-century dukes of Austria
Přemyslid dynasty
Bohemian princes
Margraves of Moravia
Sons of kings
Heirs apparent who never acceded